The Still Alarm (1930) is a short film starring the comedians Fred Allen and Clifton Webb, and directed by Roy Mack. The film was based on a skit by George S. Kaufman and released by Warner Brothers as a Vitaphone film. Allen was a vaudeville comedian, but in 1929 sound films destroyed the vaudeville market.

This film represented a rare teaming of Allen and Webb. A year earlier, Allen had acted in a short film titled The Installment Collector. This 10-minute film occupied one reel and still survives.

In 1934, Allen started his own radio show, with his wife Portland Hoffa, but made few other films himself.

References

External links

1930 films
American black-and-white films
American comedy short films
1930 comedy films
1930s American films